Clement John Carr (5 June 1901 – 2 July 1984) was an Australian rules footballer who played with Melbourne in the Victorian Football League (VFL).

Notes

External links 

1901 births
1984 deaths
Australian rules footballers from New South Wales
Melbourne Football Club players